Frank Ladson Jr. (born September 27, 2000) is an American football wide receiver for the Miami Hurricanes. Ladson began his college career at Clemson in 2019 before transferring to Miami in 2022.

High school career 
Ladson attended South Dade Senior High School in Miami-Dade County, Florida. As a senior, Ladson caught 50 passes for a school record 1,133 yards and 13 touchdowns. Ladson was invited to the All-American Bowl as a result. A five-star recruit, Ladson committed to play college football at Clemson University.

College career

Clemson 
As a freshman, Ladson recorded nine catches for 128 yards and three touchdowns. Ladson's first career catch was a 21-yard touchdown pass. The following season, Ladson tallied 18 catches for 281 yards and three touchdowns. In 2021, Ladson had four catches for 19 yards before his season was cut short due to injuries.

Miami 
In January 2022, Ladson announced he would be transferring to the University of Miami to play for the Miami Hurricanes.

References

External links 

 Miami Hurricanes bio
 Clemson Tigers bio

Living people
2000 births
American football wide receivers
Miami Hurricanes football players
Clemson Tigers football players
Players of American football from Miami
South Dade Senior High School alumni